WNY can refer to:
Washington Navy Yard
Western New York
West New York, New Jersey
White Notley railway station, Braintree, Essex, National Rail station code WNY